Harrow Lodge Park is a large public park in Hornchurch in the London Borough of Havering. It was created by Hornchurch Urban District Council, partly on land donated by Richard Costain and Sons Ltd., the developers of Elm Park Garden City housing development. It includes the cricket pitch used by Hornchurch Cricket Club.

History
A further  were added to the park when Costain, developers of Elm Park Garden City, donated land to the council as part of a planning agreement.

References

Parks and open spaces in the London Borough of Havering